Hal Osmond (27 May 1903 – December 1959) was a British stage, film and television actor. He played Anselm in The Adventures of Robin Hood episode "Errand of Mercy" (1956).

Selected filmography

 Non-Stop New York (1937) - Ship Steward (uncredited)
 Old Mother Riley in Paris (1938) - Orderly (uncredited)
 The Rake's Progress (1945) - Corporal in Scout Car (uncredited)
 The Courtneys of Curzon Street (1947) - Fireman (uncredited)
 The Greed of William Hart (1948) - Hospital Porter (uncredited)
 Miranda (1948) - Railway Carman
 My Brother's Keeper (1948) - Ticket Clerk at Shorebury (uncredited)
 Quartet (1948) - Bookshop Assistant (segment "The Colonel's Lady")
 Here Come the Huggetts (1948) - 2nd. Engineer
 Once Upon a Dream (1949) - Bailiff
 Vote for Huggett (1949) - Fishmonger
 It's Not Cricket (1949) - Stage Manager
 A Boy, a Girl and a Bike (1949) - Mr. Bates
 Marry Me (1949) - Man in Restaurant
 Helter Skelter (1949) - Radio Sound-effects Man (uncredited)
 Diamond City (1949) - Brandy Bill
 The Spider and the Fly (1949) - Swiss Taxi Driver
 Your Witness (1950) - Taxi Driver
 Double Confession (1950) - Shooting Gallery Attendant
 Last Holiday (1950) - Trade Union Man
 Waterfront (1950) - Witness in Street
 Traveller's Joy (1950) - Lapp Cameraman (uncredited)
 No Trace (1950) - Taxi Driver
 There Is Another Sun (1951) - Mannock
 Hell Is Sold Out (1951) - Bookseller (uncredited)
 The Magic Box (1951) - Conductor's Manager (uncredited)
 Death of an Angel (1952) - Railway Porter
 The Happy Family (1952) - Shop Steward
 The Story of Robin Hood (1952) - Midge the Miller
 Stolen Face (1952) - Photographer
 The Brave Don't Cry (1952) - Sandy Mackenzie
 The Lost Hours (1952) - Garage attendant
 My Wife's Lodger (1952) - Man Sitting on Bench (uncredited)
 Top Secret (1952) - Jersey Waiter
 The Gambler and the Lady (1952) - Fred - Stable Groom
 Three Steps to the Gallows (1953) - Hotel Porter
 The Net (1953) - Agent Lawson
 Top of the Form (1953) - Barber (uncredited)
 The Steel Key (1953) - Taxi Driver
 The Oracle (1953) - Workman in White Apron (uncredited)
 The Sword and the Rose (1953) - Costermonger
 A Day to Remember (1953) - Large Lady's Husband (uncrredited)
 Love in Pawn (1953) - Burglar
 The Dog and the Diamonds (1953) - Crook
 The Million Pound Note (1954) - Arthur 
 Meet Mr. Malcolm (1954) - Joe - Cloakroom Attendant (uncredited)
 You Know What Sailors Are (1954) - Stores Petty Officer
 Fast and Loose (1954) - Man at car crash scene
 Forbidden Cargo (1954) - Baggage Room Clerk
 The Young Lovers (1954) - Detective at station and on train (uncredited)
 The Crowded Day (1954) - Liftman
 To Dorothy a Son (1954) - Livingstone Potts
 Tiger by the Tail (1954) - Electrical Inspector
 The Delavine Affair (1955) - Old Man
 The Gilded Cage (1955) - Hotel Porter (uncredited)
 Value for Money (1955) - Mr. Hall
 Simon and Laura (1955) - Effects Man
 No Smoking (1955) - Yokel
 Now and Forever (1956) - Gas Station Man (uncredited)
 Bond of Fear (1956) - Hospital Orderly
 Passport to Treason (1956) - Barman
 Eyewitness (1956) - Hospital Doorman (uncredited)
 It's A Wonderful World (1956) - Removal Man
 The Last Man to Hang (1956) - Coates: Member of the Jury
 Loser Takes All (1956) - Liftman (uncredited)
 Three Men in a Boat (1956) - Cabbie (Ext. J's House)
 The Big Money (1956) - Porter at Victoria Railway Station (uncredited)
 Town on Trial  (1957) - Petrol Station Attendant (uncredited)
 Murder Reported (1957) - Porter
 Stranger in Town (1957) - Hotel Barman
 Hell Drivers (1957) - Station Ticket Clerk (uncredited)
 You Can't Escape (1957) - Poacher's Friend
 High Flight (1957) - Barman
 The Vicious Circle (1957) - Joe - Golf Caddy
 The Truth About Women (1957) - Baker
 Just My Luck (1957) - Hospital Visitor with Flowers (uncredited)
 The Depraved (1957) - Barman
 Carve Her Name With Pride (1958) - Bus Passenger (uncredited)
 Wonderful Things! (1958) - Angry Busker (uncredited)
 On the Run (1958) - Sam Bassett
 A Night to Remember (1958) - Steward (uncredited)
 Blood of the Vampire (1958) - Small Sneak Thief
 Tread Softly Stranger (1958) - Flatcap
 Links of Justice (1958) - (uncredited)
 The Great Van Robbery (1959) - Freddie
 The 39 Steps (1959) - Stage Manager
 Innocent Meeting (1959) - Shopkeeper
 Jack the Ripper (1959) - Snakey the Pickpocket
 No Safety Ahead (1959) - (uncredited)
 Web of Suspicion (1959) - Charlie
 Top Floor Girl (1959 - (uncredited)
 Crash Drive (1959) - Patient in Hospital

References

External links

1903 births
1959 deaths
English male stage actors
English male film actors
English male television actors
Male actors from London
20th-century English male actors